The Mountain Quarries Bridge is a railroad bridge across the North Fork American River, near Auburn, spanning between El Dorado and Placer counties.  It is a concrete arch bridge that was built in 1912 to transport quarried rock.

Names
The Mountain Quarries Bridge has also been known as the Mountain Quarry Cement Bridge, the American River Quarry Bridge, the Pacific Portland Cement Company Railroad Bridge, the Auburn Concrete Arch Bridge, and the No Hands Bridge.

National Register of Historic Places
The Mountain Quarries Bridge was listed on the National Register of Historic Places in 2004.

According to its 2002 NRHP nomination — the bridge "although massive, ...is plain in appearance yet possesses a gracefulness that is in perfect harmony with its rugged surroundings."

See also
 
 National Register of Historic Places listings in Placer County, California

References 

Railroad bridges in California
Transportation buildings and structures in Placer County, California
Concrete bridges in California
Deck arch bridges in the United States
Railroad bridges on the National Register of Historic Places in California
National Register of Historic Places in El Dorado County, California
National Register of Historic Places in Placer County, California
Bridges completed in 1912
1912 establishments in California
Bridges over the American River